Wild Arabia is a British nature documentary series, first broadcast on BBC Two and BBC HD from 22 February to 8 March 2013. Produced by the BBC Natural History Unit and narrated by Alexander Siddig, the three-part series focuses on the landscapes, wildlife and people of the Arabian Peninsula. Each episode is followed by a ten-minute Wild Arabia Diaries segment, illustrating the techniques used to film a particular subject.

The series forms part of the Natural History Unit's "Continents" strand. It was preceded by Madagascar in 2011 and followed by Wild Brazil in 2014.

The series premiered in Australia on 19 July 2015 on Nat Geo Wild.

Episodes

References

External links
 

BBC television documentaries
BBC high definition shows
Documentary films about nature
Nature educational television series
2013 British television series debuts
2013 British television series endings
English-language television shows
Animal Planet original programming